The 2006 Winnipeg Blue Bombers finished with a 9–9 record and made the playoffs for the first time since 2003. Due to the suspension of the Ottawa Renegades just prior to the 2006 season, the Blue Bombers switched to the East Division. The team attempted to win their 11th Grey Cup championship, but they lost in the East Semi-Final versus the Toronto Argonauts.

Offseason

CFL Draft

Regular season

Season standings

Season schedule

Playoffs

East Semi-Final
Date and time: Sunday, November 5, 12:00 PM Central Standard TimeVenue: Rogers Centre, Toronto, Ontario

References

Winnipeg Blue Bombers
Winnipeg Blue Bombers seasons